This is a list of dermatologists who have made notable contributions to the field of dermatology.

Dermatologists in popular culture
 Dr. Sandra Lee, presenter of the TLC TV series Dr. Pimple Popper

Fictional dermatologists
 Dr. Archibald Newlands (Martin Donovan) in the television series Law & Order: Special Victims Unit
 Dr. Sara Sitarides (Marcia Cross) in the television sitcom Seinfeld
 Dr. Emily Sweeney (Laura Spencer) in the television series The Big Bang Theory

References

 
Lists of health professionals
Lists of physicians